Lieve Pietersz Verschuier (1627–1686) was a Dutch Golden Age painter of maritime subjects.

Biography
He was born in Rotterdam, and is documented in Amsterdam in 1651, where he possibly learned to paint from Simon de Vlieger. He traveled to Rome in 1653 as a young man with Jan Vermeer van Utrecht and became friends with Willem Drost and Johann Carl Loth.  On his return he settled in Rotterdam in 1667 where he remained, painting marine scenes, and Italianate landscapes.

His maritime works are valued today for their historical value illustrating the art of shipbuilding in the 17th century.

References

1627 births
1686 deaths
Painters from Rotterdam
Dutch Golden Age painters
Dutch male painters
Dutch marine artists